Railway World was an English-based monthly magazine covering rail transport in Great Britain. Founded by GH Lake in 1939 as Railways, in 1940 it was taken over by JW Fowler and renamed Railway World. It was sold to Ian Allan Publishing in 1959. The final edition was published in February 2003, it was superseded by Railways Illustrated the following month.

References

Monthly magazines published in the United Kingdom
Magazines established in 1939
Magazines disestablished in 2003
Rail transport magazines published in the United Kingdom
1939 establishments in England
2003 disestablishments in England